Belgium competed at the 2000 Summer Olympics in Sydney, Australia.

Medalists

Archery

Athletics

Men
Track and road events

Track and road events

Women
Track and road events

Badminton

Canoeing

Cycling

Mountain Biking

Road

Track

Equestrian

Eventing

Jumping

Gymnastics

Artistic
Sigrid Persoon
 Women's Individual All-Around – 43rd place
 Horse Vault – 18th place
 Floor Exercise – 54th place
 Uneven Bars – 64th place
 Balance Beam – 68th place

Judo

Men

Women

Rowing

Sailing

Two men and two women competed in the Sailing competition in four different events.

Men

Women

Shooting

Women

Swimming

Men

Women

Table Tennis

Men

Tennis

Women

Triathlon

At the inaugural Olympic triathlon competition, Belgium was represented by two women.  One finished, placing sixteenth, while the other withdrew during the second phase.

Weightlifting

References
Wallechinsky, David (2004). The Complete Book of the Summer Olympics (Athens 2004 Edition). Toronto, Canada. . 
International Olympic Committee (2001). The Results. Retrieved 12 November 2005.
Sydney Organising Committee for the Olympic Games (2001). Official Report of the XXVII Olympiad Volume 1: Preparing for the Games. Retrieved 20 November 2005.
Sydney Organising Committee for the Olympic Games (2001). Official Report of the XXVII Olympiad Volume 2: Celebrating the Games. Retrieved 20 November 2005.
Sydney Organising Committee for the Olympic Games (2001). The Results. Retrieved 20 November 2005.
International Olympic Committee Web Site
sports-reference

Nations at the 2000 Summer Olympics
2000 Summer Olympics
Olympic